The 2013–14 Copa Chile, (officially known as Copa Chile MTS 2013/14 because of its sponsorship), was the 34th edition of the Copa Chile, the country's national cup tournament. The competition started on June 23, 2013 with the First Round and concludes on 2014 with the Final. The winner qualifies for the 2014 Copa Sudamericana and the 2014 Supercopa de Chile.

Schedule

Teams
A total 32 clubs were accepted for the competition. For this edition the teams are from the Primera División and Primera B, only.

First round
On this round every team plays home and away against every other team in its group. The best 2 teams from each group advance to the next round.

Group 1

Group 2

Group 3

Group 4

Group 5

Group 6

Group 7

Group 8

Second round

|}

Quarterfinals

|}

Semifinals

First leg

Second leg

Final

Top goalscorers

References
 Official site of the Copa Chile 
 Copa Chile 2013, Soccerway.com

Copa Chile
Chile
Copa Chile seasons